Gregory Mark Logins Jr (born March 16, 1988) is an American professional basketball player. He was born in Sodus, New York to Greg Logins Sr and Shirley Jackson. He has four siblings, Denzell, Shamar, Alexis and Kiera.
At Canisius College (Buffalo, New York) he obtained an Undergraduate degree in Physical Education and Health as well as a master's degree in Sports Administration in 2011. He is in his ninth overall season as a professional basketball player.

Early career
Logins' success started in high school with the Sodus Spartans, which he helped lead to a league title as well as a New York State Championship Title in 2005, in which they held a record of 27-0. He was named to the first team New York State as a junior and was named State Champion Most Valuable Player. In his senior year, he helped the team win another season title. Logins was named player of the week 15 times as well as Most Valuable Player of the year. Furthermore, he made the Mc Donald's All Star Game Rochester and was named to the all first team Greater Rochester. Until this day, Logins holds the record for most rebounds during an All Star game (25).

During his post-graduate year at Kent School in Connecticut, he was named captain of the team and Most Valuable Player of the season. Furthermore, he made the top 50 players of the state of Connecticut.

College
Logins Jr played College basketball for the Canisius Golden Griffins of the Canisius College in Buffalo, New York from 2007 until 2011. As a three-time team captain, he finished his career as one of five players in school history to score more than 1,200 career points and grab 750-plus career rebounds. Logins Jr ranks 15th in school history with 1,269 career points and fifth in career rebounds with 758 in 123 career games.

Further mentionable honors and achievements are:
Freshman All-Mid-Major 1st Team of the country
Three time Freshman Player of the Week
3rd Team all MAAC honors
All MAAC 1st Team Academic Honors
All Jesuit Academic Honors
I-AAA ADA scholar-athlete
1,000 point club
Over 700 rebound club
Top 5 in rebounds grabbed in school history
Player of the week eight times throughout his Division 1 career
Canisius College Dean's list

Professional career
After starting off his rookie season in Mexico in 2011, where he became the top scorer, and best rebounder of the league, basketball took Logins Jr all around the globe. As of today, he played professional basketball in Morocco, Finland, Japan, Germany, Israel, Argentina, and Denmark. He had appearances in the playoffs four times, and made the 2nd team All Germany (2nd league), and was honored Player of the week multiple times.

References

External links
 Official homepage - http://www.gregloginsjr.com/resume/
 College Profile & Statistics - https://gogriffs.com/roster.aspx?rp_id=3081
 Statistics - https://basketball.realgm.com/player/Greg-Logins/Summary/18041

1988 births
Living people
Canisius College alumni
Kent School alumni
American men's basketball players